Azureus may refer to:

 Azure (color), (Latin: Azureus)
 Azureus (software), former name of the BitTorrent client Vuze
 Azureus Inc., former name of the BitTorrent company Vuze, Inc.
 Dendrobates tinctorius 'Azureus', Blue Poison Dart Frog